"Home Tonight" and "In a Hurry" are songs by Paul McCartney, released as a digital double A-side single on 22 November 2019. The two songs were later released as a vinyl single on 29 November 2019, as part of Record Store Day. Both tracks were left over from the sessions for McCartney's 2018 album Egypt Station. The release featured artwork based on the game exquisite corpse. "Home Tonight" was later included on the Home EP, released to promote McCartney's 2020 album McCartney III.

Reception

The single received generally positive reviews from critics. Stereogum described "Home Tonight" as "true-to-form for McCartney", highlighting the track's brass embellishments and "jammy" feel. "In a Hurry" was acclaimed by the magazine for its "asymmetrical" synthesizer parts and "frenzied" atmosphere. Rolling Stone said the songs showed McCartney's "pop prowess hasn't diminished, with 'Home Tonight' and 'In a Hurry' both incorporating McCartney's trademark Beatlesque melodies with more modern techniques." UDiscoverMusic compared the subject matter of "In a Hurry" to that of McCartney's 1971 hit "Another Day", highlighting the lyric "Every minute, she'd be rushing, someone always breathing down her neck/Felt like everyone was pushing her down, keeping her in check".

While the song did not chart in McCartney's native UK, it did reach number 49 on the Belgian region of Flanders' Ultratop chart.

Track listing

 "Home Tonight" – 3:04
 "In a Hurry" – 4:04

References

2019 singles
2019 songs
Paul McCartney songs
Song recordings produced by Greg Kurstin
Song recordings produced by Paul McCartney
Songs written by Paul McCartney